Allister Georges Freund Heath (born 1977), is a French-born British business journalist, author and commentator. He was appointed as the new editor of The Sunday Telegraph in April 2017.

Early life and education 
The son of Alexander and Sylviane Heath, Allister Heath was born in Mulhouse in Alsace, France, to a part-British family. Heath was initially educated at the College Émile Zola, Kingersheim, followed by the Lycée Lambert, in Mulhouse. He lived there until the age of 17, when he moved to England to study economics at the London School of Economics (1995–1998), followed by a post-graduate MPhil in the subject at Hertford College, Oxford.

Career 
From 2000 to 2002, Heath was editor of the European Journal and head of research at the European Foundation. Since then, he has mostly worked in journalism. In 2006, he became an associate editor at The Spectator, continuing in this role until 2008. He was a contributing editor at the magazine from 2008 to 2011.

Heath undertook a number of roles at The Business, a London-based magazine. In 2002, he was its economics correspondent, then from 2002 to 2005 was economics editor and leader writer, rising to the roles of deputy editor (2005–06) and editor (2007–08). The publication closed shortly after his departure in 2008.

Heath was editor of City A.M., a business newspaper, from 2008 to 2014. Since 2012, he has worked for The Daily Telegraph, initially as a columnist. From 2014 to 2017, he was deputy director for content and the paper's deputy editor. He became editor of The Sunday Telegraph in April 2017, replacing Ian MacGregor.

Heath has also been Wincott Visiting Professor of Business Journalism at the University of Buckingham (2005–2007). He was chairman of the 2020 Tax Commission from 2011 to 2012, authoring The Single Income Tax: Final Report of the 2020 Tax Commission for it in 2012.

His first book, A Flat Tax: Towards a British Model (co-written with D. B. Smith), was published in 2006. The same year, his book At a Price: the true cost of public spending, was also published.

In July 2016, Heath spoke at the 60th Anniversary Gala of the Institute of Economic Affairs. In October 2017, the commentator Iain Dale put him at Number 87 on his list of 'The Top 100 Most Influential People on the Right'. In June 2018, Heath said that "Cultural Marxism is running rampant."

Positions 
In 2014, Heath advised that it was time to reject crony capitalism and embrace the real thing. 

In October 2019, he backed the Brexit Withdrawal Agreement negotiated by Boris Johnson, arguing "it is as good as it gets" and urging MPs to approve it. In December 2020, he said he believed Brexit was a "positive shock for Britain" and the time the country had spent in the EU was "a calamity for Britain".

In June 2021, Heath held that the Withdrawal Agreement's Northern Ireland Protocol "was imposed on the UK by Brussels at the moment of our greatest weakness", arguing it should be renegotiated.

In September 2022, Heath welcomed the mini-budget submitted by the UK Chancellor of the Exchequer, Kwasi Kwarteng, with unbridled enthusiasm. In a front page commentary in The Daily Telegraph, Heath wrote:

The budget triggered a financial crisis in the UK. The chancellor was fired three weeks later and his tax cuts were withdrawn, followed six days later by the resignation of Prime Minister Liz Truss.

Awards and recognition 
In February 2012, Heath was announced as the winner of the Institute of Economic Affairs Free Enterprise Award for 2011.

Personal life 
Heath married his wife Neda in 2002, and the couple have two daughters. He lists his recreations in Who's Who as "family".

References

1978 births
Living people
Alumni of the London School of Economics
Alumni of Hertford College, Oxford
British male journalists
French emigrants to England
The Daily Telegraph people
The Spectator people
French people of British descent